The Welsh Artist of the Year award was an annual art competition in Cardiff's St David's Hall, open to amateur and professional artists with a link to Wales. It ran annually from 2000.

The competition became a significant feature in the Welsh visual arts calendar, possibly due to the prestige associated with the title Welsh Artist of The Year. However the title's relationship with the actual competition structure could be seen as misleading, first because the selection process required the artist to submit an application form and pay an entry fee (therefore only participating artists could be considered). The selection was also limited to one artwork per artist, and that artwork was limited in size, rather than considering an artist's entire contribution for the year, which the title may suggest. A comparison with Cardiff's well-resourced Artes Mundi prize may put the actual stature of Welsh Artist of the Year into perspective.

Prizes were awarded in Painting, Drawing, Sculpture, Photography, and Applied arts categories, as well as a Student prize. An overall winner and runner-up prize were awarded. Winners were chosen by a judging panel composed mainly of fellow artists, with the winner receiving a cheque for £2000.

Following the announcement of the winners in June an exhibition was held at St David's Hall, showing the prizewinners and shortlisted works.

It was announced that the competition would not be held in 2014, as staff would be focusing their efforts on developing the "visual arts in the capital".

Winners

See also
 List of European art awards

References

Awards established in 2001
Contemporary art awards
Welsh contemporary art
British art awards
2001 establishments in Wales
Annual events in Wales
Welsh art awards